FC CSKA Kyiv is a Ukrainian amateur football club, until 2001 of the Central Sports Club of the Armed Forces of Ukraine, which is government sponsored by the Ministry of Defense. As its farm team CSKA-2 Kyiv, in 1994–2001 it served as a farm team of CSKA Kyiv which later was renamed into Arsenal Kyiv.

After reorganization in 2001 the football section "FC CSKA Kyiv" was privately sponsored until 2009 when it withdrew from the professional league 4 September 2009 due to lack of financial support.

History

DO/SKA Kyiv (1934–1992)

The football team has founded in 1934 in Kharkiv as part of the Soviet Officers' Club (later CSKA) receiving the name UVO Kharkiv (Ukrainian Military District – Kharkiv). During the Soviet regime the team was part of the Soviet Armed Forces sports society. At the end of 1934 the team was transferred to Kyiv during the transfer of republican capital. Its name has changed to DO Kyiv (Officers' Club – Kyiv). In 1947–1956 the team was called ODO Kyiv (District Officers' Club – Kyiv) and in 1952, under this name, the team reached the semifinal stage of the Soviet National Cup. In 1957, the team played under the name OSK Kyiv (District Sports Club – Kyiv). The year of 1957 is considered the official year of establishment of CSK ZSU. In 1957–1959 the Kyivan army men football team was called SKVO Kyiv (Sports Club Military District – Kyiv) and in 1960–1971 – SKA Kyiv (Sports Club of Army – Kyiv). In 1972, the team moved to Chernihiv and changed its name to SK Chernihiv and had moved back to Kyiv in 1976 as SKA. In 1981–1982, the team had its last Soviet First League stint at the second level of Soviet football.

CSKA Kyiv (1992–1994)
FC CSKA Kyiv was created in place of the Soviet football team SKA Kyiv on 15 December 1992 during the reorganization of the Ukrainian military. Its first season in 1992 the club finished under its old name SKA Kyiv which was changed during the summer of 1992 to ZS – Oriana (abbr. Armed Forces – Oriana). In 1993 team changed its name to ZS – Oriana (Armed Forces – Oriana) and then to CSK ZSU (Central Sport Club of Armed Forces of Ukraine). The highest place it reached in the Ukrainian championships was the fifth in the First League.

Second team of CSKA-Borysfen & Arsenal (1994–2001)

In 1994, FC CSKA Kyiv while being in the Third League was promoted to the Second League. Borysfen Boryspil that was playing in the 1994–95 Ukrainian First League in the mid-season merged with the Central Sports Club of the Armed Forces of Ukraine under the name FC CSKA-Borysfen Kyiv. At that time the Central Sports Club of the Armed Forces of Ukraine obtained two professional teams, one in the Ukrainian First League, while the other in the Ukrainian Second League. FC CSKA Kyiv was kept as the Borysfen's second team in the Second League. In 1995 FC CSKA-Borysfen Kyiv was promoted to the Ukrainian Higher League.

Upon conclusion of the 1995–96 Ukrainian Premier League season Borysfen was omitted from the name and the reserve team, which coincidentally gained promotion to the First League now, automatically became CSKA-2 Kyiv. In 1997 Boryspil team was restored first on the Amateur Level and then gaining professional status once again.

In 2001, the Central Sports Club of the Armed Forces of Ukraine sold the club. The first team was bought by the Kyivan municipal administration and reformed into the new Kyivan club "FC Arsenal Kyiv". In turn, the second team was sold to another owner and reverted to the name of CSKA Kyiv continuing to play in the Ukrainian First League.

CSKA Kyiv

Since 2001 FC CSKA Kyiv played in the Ukrainian First League until 2008 when it was relegated to the Ukrainian Second League.

In 2009 FC CSKA Kyiv went bankrupt and the club disappeared from football.

Reformation as an amateur club (since 2013)
CSKA was only absent from football for 4 years. In 2013, the amateur football team Atlant Kyiv and the public organization "CSKA of Ukraine" established an amateur football club called CSKA Kyiv. Since 2013, the football team CSKA plays among amateur teams in the Premier Division of the Kyiv Region Championship Football League .

In 2015, CSKA Kyiv led by Viktor Ishchenko applied for the Makarov Memorial tournament. The new CSKA team is represented by the Republican College of Physical Education.

2021
The team participates in the Championship and Cup of the KSRFF (Kiev-Svyatoshinsky Regional Football Federation).

Naming history
1934 – UVO Kharkov
1934 – DO Kyiv
1947 – ODO Kyiv
1957 – OSK Kyiv
1957 – SKVO Kyiv
1960 – SKA Kyiv
1971 – SK Chernihiv
1976 – SKA Kyiv
1992 – FC ZS-Oriyana Kyiv
1993 – FC CSK ZSU Kyiv
1994 – FC CSKA Kyiv
1995 – FC CSKA-2 Kyiv
2001 – FC CSKA Kyiv

Honours

SKA Kyiv
 Ukrainian SSR Championship
Winners (4): 1949, 1951, 1980, 1983
Runners up (5): 1946, 1964, 1965, 1977, 1979
Cup of the Ukrainian SSR
Winners (1): 1976
Runner up (1): 1954

Domestic competitions

Soviet Union

SKA Kyiv
{|class="wikitable"
|-bgcolor="#efefef"
! Season
! Div.
! Pos.
! Pl.
! W
! D
! L
! GS
! GA
! P
!Domestic Cup
!colspan=2|Europe
!Notes
|-
|align=center colspan=14|UDKA Kyiv
|-bgcolor=SteelBlue
|align=center|1936
|align=center|Rep 1
|align=center|3
|align=center|4
|align=center|2
|align=center|0
|align=center|2
|align=center|5
|align=center|5
|align=center|8
|align=center|
|align=center|
|align=center|
|align=center|UkrSSR
|-
|align=center colspan=14|ODO Kyiv
|-bgcolor=LightCyan
|align=center|1947
|align=center rowspan=4|2
|align=center|5
|align=center|24
|align=center|13
|align=center|1
|align=center|10
|align=center|56
|align=center|34
|align=center|27
|align=center|
|align=center|
|align=center|
|align=center|Zone UkrSSR
|-bgcolor=LightCyan
|align=center rowspan="2"|1948
|align=center bgcolor=silver|2
|align=center|14
|align=center|9
|align=center|4
|align=center|1
|align=center|27
|align=center|14
|align=center|22
|align=center rowspan="2"|
|align=center rowspan="2"|
|align=center rowspan="2"|
|align=center|Subgroup B
|-bgcolor=LightCyan
|align=center bgcolor=tan|3
|align=center|3
|align=center|1
|align=center|0
|align=center|2
|align=center|3
|align=center|6
|align=center|2
|align=center|Final of UkrSSR
|-bgcolor=LightCyan
|align=center|1949
|align=center bgcolor=tan|3
|align=center|34
|align=center|20
|align=center|8
|align=center|6
|align=center|93
|align=center|34
|align=center|48
|align=center|
|align=center|
|align=center|
|align=center|Zone UkrSSR
|-bgcolor=PowderBlue
|align=center|1950-51
|align=center colspan=13|Club is idle
|-bgcolor=LightCyan
|align=center rowspan="2"|1952
|align=center rowspan=6|2
|align=center|5
|align=center|4
|align=center|0
|align=center|3
|align=center|1
|align=center|2
|align=center|4
|align=center|3
|align=center rowspan="2"|
|align=center rowspan="2"|
|align=center rowspan="2"|
|align=center|Group Baku
|-bgcolor=LightCyan
|align=center|14
|align=center|8
|align=center|4
|align=center|0
|align=center|4
|align=center|13
|align=center|9
|align=center|8
|align=center|Final for 10-18 places
|-bgcolor=LightCyan
|align=center|1953
|align=center colspan=11|Club withdrew
|align=center|Zone 3
|-bgcolor=LightCyan
|align=center|1954
|align=center|11
|align=center|22
|align=center|6
|align=center|4
|align=center|12
|align=center|34
|align=center|45
|align=center|16
|align=center|
|align=center|
|align=center|
|align=center|Zone 3
|-bgcolor=LightCyan
|align=center|1955
|align=center bgcolor=tan|3
|align=center|30
|align=center|14
|align=center|8
|align=center|8
|align=center|44
|align=center|27
|align=center|36
|align=center|
|align=center|
|align=center|
|align=center|Zone 1
|-bgcolor=LightCyan
|align=center|1956
|align=center|6
|align=center|34
|align=center|15
|align=center|9
|align=center|10
|align=center|43
|align=center|27
|align=center|39
|align=center|
|align=center|
|align=center|
|align=center|Zone 1
|-
|align=center colspan=14|OSK Kyiv / SKVO Kyiv
|-bgcolor=LightCyan
|align=center|1957
|align=center rowspan=2|2
|align=center|8
|align=center|34
|align=center|14
|align=center|9
|align=center|11
|align=center|42
|align=center|36
|align=center|37
|align=center|
|align=center|
|align=center|
|align=center|Zone 2
|-bgcolor=LightCyan
|align=center|1958
|align=center|8
|align=center|30
|align=center|11
|align=center|9
|align=center|10
|align=center|44
|align=center|38
|align=center|31
|align=center|
|align=center|
|align=center|
|align=center|Zone 3
|-bgcolor=PowderBlue
|align=center|1959-60
|align=center colspan=13|Club is idle
|-
|align=center colspan=14|SKA Kyiv
|-bgcolor=LightCyan
|align=center rowspan="2"|1961
|align=center rowspan="4"|2
|align=center|12
|align=center|36
|align=center|11
|align=center|11
|align=center|14
|align=center|45
|align=center|41
|align=center|33
|align=center rowspan="2"|
|align=center rowspan="2"|
|align=center rowspan="2"|
|align=center|Ukrainian Zone 2
|-bgcolor=LightCyan
|align=center|24
|align=center|2
|align=center|0
|align=center|1
|align=center|1
|align=center|3
|align=center|6
|align=center|1
|align=center|Ukrainian Final for 23 place
|-bgcolor=LightCyan
|align=center rowspan="2"|1962
|align=center bgcolor=tan|3
|align=center|24
|align=center|10
|align=center|10
|align=center|4
|align=center|39
|align=center|21
|align=center|30
|align=center rowspan="2"|
|align=center rowspan="2"|
|align=center rowspan="2"|
|align=center|Ukrainian Zone 2
|-bgcolor=LightCyan
|align=center|10
|align=center|10
|align=center|5
|align=center|1
|align=center|4
|align=center|18
|align=center|17
|align=center|11
|align=center bgcolor=pink|Ukrainian Final for 7–17 places, League Reorganization
|-bgcolor=PowderBlue
|align=center|1963
|align=center rowspan="5"|3
|align=center|17
|align=center|38
|align=center|16
|align=center|12
|align=center|10
|align=center|54
|align=center|26
|align=center|44
|align=center|
|align=center|
|align=center|
|align=center|Ukrainian Zone 1
|-bgcolor=PowderBlue
|align=center rowspan="2"|1964
|align=center bgcolor=gold|1
|align=center|30
|align=center|21
|align=center|4
|align=center|5
|align=center|55
|align=center|19
|align=center|46
|align=center rowspan="2"|
|align=center rowspan="2"|
|align=center rowspan="2"|
|align=center bgcolor=lightgreen|Ukrainian Zone 2
|-bgcolor=PowderBlue
|align=center bgcolor=silver|2
|align=center|10
|align=center|8
|align=center|0
|align=center|2
|align=center|15
|align=center|8
|align=center|16
|align=center|Ukrainian Final for 1–6 places
|-bgcolor=PowderBlue
|align=center rowspan="2"|1965
|align=center bgcolor=gold|1
|align=center|30
|align=center|22
|align=center|4
|align=center|4
|align=center|65
|align=center|22
|align=center|48
|align=center rowspan="2"|
|align=center rowspan="2"|
|align=center rowspan="2"|
|align=center |Ukrainian Zone 1
|-bgcolor=PowderBlue
|align=center bgcolor=silver|2
|align=center|10
|align=center|7
|align=center|1
|align=center|2
|align=center|23
|align=center|16
|align=center|15
|align=center bgcolor=lightgreen|Ukrainian Final for 1–6 places
|-bgcolor=LightCyan
|align=center|1966
|align=center rowspan="6"|2
|align=center bgcolor=silver|2
|align=center|34
|align=center|17
|align=center|7
|align=center|10
|align=center|42
|align=center|36
|align=center|41
|align=center|
|align=center|
|align=center|
|align=center|Zone 2
|-bgcolor=LightCyan
|align=center rowspan="2"|1967
|align=center bgcolor=gold|1
|align=center|38
|align=center|20
|align=center|11
|align=center|7
|align=center|47
|align=center|27
|align=center|51
|align=center rowspan="2"|
|align=center rowspan="2"|
|align=center rowspan="2"|
|align=center|Zone 2
|-bgcolor=LightCyan
|align=center bgcolor=tan|3
|align=center|4
|align=center|0
|align=center|2
|align=center|2
|align=center|3
|align=center|6
|align=center|2
|align=center|Final for 1–3 places
|-bgcolor=LightCyan
|align=center|1968
|align=center bgcolor=silver|2
|align=center|40
|align=center|23
|align=center|11
|align=center|6
|align=center|58
|align=center|23
|align=center|57
|align=center|
|align=center|
|align=center|
|align=center|Zone 1
|-bgcolor=LightCyan
|align=center|1969
|align=center bgcolor=silver|2
|align=center|42
|align=center|18
|align=center|16
|align=center|8
|align=center|51
|align=center|30
|align=center|52
|align=center|
|align=center|
|align=center|
|align=center|Zone 3
|-bgcolor=LightCyan
|align=center|1970
|align=center|19
|align=center|42
|align=center|11
|align=center|10
|align=center|21
|align=center|39
|align=center|50
|align=center|32
|align=center|
|align=center|
|align=center|
|align=center bgcolor=pink|Relegated
|-bgcolor=PowderBlue
|align=center|1971
|align=center rowspan="1"|3
|align=center|17
|align=center|50
|align=center|15
|align=center|17
|align=center|18
|align=center|43
|align=center|44
|align=center|47
|align=center|
|align=center|
|align=center|
|align=center|Zone 1
|-
|}

SK Chernihiv
{|class="wikitable"
|-bgcolor="#efefef"
! Season
! Div.
! Pos.
! Pl.
! W
! D
! L
! GS
! GA
! P
!Domestic Cup
!colspan=2|Europe
!Notes
|-bgcolor=PowderBlue
|align=center colspan=14|Moved to Chernihiv instead of dissolved FC Desna Chernihiv
|-bgcolor=PowderBlue
|align=center|1972
|align=center rowspan="4"|3
|align=center|10
|align=center|46
|align=center|19
|align=center|14
|align=center|13
|align=center|59
|align=center|44
|align=center|52
|align=center|
|align=center|
|align=center|
|align=center|Zone 1
|-bgcolor=PowderBlue
|align=center|1973
|align=center|11
|align=center|44
|align=center|18
|align=center|8
|align=center|18
|align=center|63
|align=center|56
|align=center|38
|align=center|
|align=center|
|align=center|
|align=center|Zone 1
|-bgcolor=PowderBlue
|align=center|1974
|align=center|6
|align=center|38
|align=center|17
|align=center|9
|align=center|12
|align=center|63
|align=center|46
|align=center|43
|align=center|
|align=center|
|align=center|
|align=center|Zone 6
|-bgcolor=PowderBlue
|align=center|1975
|align=center|4
|align=center|32
|align=center|12
|align=center|13
|align=center|7
|align=center|41
|align=center|33
|align=center|37
|align=center|
|align=center|
|align=center|
|align=center|Zone 6
|-bgcolor=PowderBlue
|align=center colspan=14|Moved back to Kyiv
|-
|}

SKA Kyiv
{|class="wikitable"
|-bgcolor="#efefef"
! Season
! Div.
! Pos.
! Pl.
! W
! D
! L
! GS
! GA
! P
!colspan=2|Domestic Cup
!Notes
|-bgcolor=PowderBlue
|align=center|1976
|align=center rowspan="6"|3
|align=center|11
|align=center|38
|align=center|12
|align=center|11
|align=center|15
|align=center|36
|align=center|44
|align=center|35
|align=center|
|align=center|
|align=center|Zone 6
|-bgcolor=PowderBlue
|align=center|1977
|align=center bgcolor=silver|2
|align=center|44
|align=center|26
|align=center|11
|align=center|7
|align=center|63
|align=center|32
|align=center|63
|align=center|
|align=center|
|align=center|Zone 2
|-bgcolor=PowderBlue
|align=center|1978
|align=center bgcolor=tan|3
|align=center|44
|align=center|23
|align=center|14
|align=center|7
|align=center|71
|align=center|29
|align=center|60
|align=center|
|align=center|
|align=center|Zone 2
|-bgcolor=PowderBlue
|align=center|1979
|align=center bgcolor=silver|2
|align=center|46
|align=center|26
|align=center|12
|align=center|8
|align=center|65
|align=center|32
|align=center|64
|align=center|
|align=center|
|align=center|Zone 2
|-bgcolor=PowderBlue
|align=center rowspan="2"|1980
|align=center bgcolor=gold|1
|align=center|44
|align=center|28
|align=center|9
|align=center|7
|align=center|83
|align=center|33
|align=center|65
|align=center|
|align=center|
|align=center|Q Finals (Zone 5)
|-bgcolor=PowderBlue
|align=center bgcolor=gold|1
|align=center|4
|align=center|2
|align=center|2
|align=center|0
|align=center|8
|align=center|5
|align=center|6
|align=center|
|align=center|
|align=center bgcolor=lightgreen|Promoted (Final 3)
|-bgcolor=LightCyan
|align=center|1981
|align=center rowspan="2"|2
|align=center|17
|align=center|46
|align=center|16
|align=center|10
|align=center|20
|align=center|59
|align=center|71
|align=center|42
|align=center|
|align=center|
|align=center|
|-bgcolor=LightCyan
|align=center|1982
|align=center|21
|align=center|42
|align=center|5
|align=center|10
|align=center|27
|align=center|31
|align=center|81
|align=center|20
|align=center|
|align=center|
|align=center bgcolor=pink|Relegated
|-bgcolor=PowderBlue
|align=center rowspan="2"|1983
|align=center rowspan="9"|3
|align=center bgcolor=gold|1
|align=center|50
|align=center|28
|align=center|16
|align=center|6
|align=center|91
|align=center|49
|align=center|72
|align=center rowspan="2"|
|align=center rowspan="2"|
|align=center|Zone 6
|-bgcolor=PowderBlue
|align=center bgcolor=tan|3
|align=center|4
|align=center|1
|align=center|0
|align=center|3
|align=center|6
|align=center|7
|align=center|2
|align=center|Zone 6, Final 1
|-bgcolor=PowderBlue
|align=center rowspan="2"|1984
|align=center bgcolor=tan|3
|align=center|24
|align=center|10
|align=center|8
|align=center|6
|align=center|38
|align=center|22
|align=center|28
|align=center rowspan="2"|
|align=center rowspan="2"|
|align=center|Zone 6, 1st Group
|-bgcolor=PowderBlue
|align=center|4
|align=center|36
|align=center|19
|align=center|7
|align=center|10
|align=center|65
|align=center|37
|align=center|45
|align=center|Zone 6, finals
|-bgcolor=PowderBlue
|align=center rowspan="2"|1985
|align=center bgcolor=tan|3
|align=center|26
|align=center|11
|align=center|10
|align=center|5
|align=center|38
|align=center|28
|align=center|32
|align=center rowspan="2"|
|align=center rowspan="2"|
|align=center|Zone 6, 1st Group
|-bgcolor=PowderBlue
|align=center|4
|align=center|40
|align=center|19
|align=center|11
|align=center|10
|align=center|62
|align=center|46
|align=center|49
|align=center|Zone 6, finals
|-bgcolor=PowderBlue
|align=center rowspan="2"|1986
|align=center bgcolor=gold|1
|align=center|26
|align=center|14
|align=center|6
|align=center|6
|align=center|39
|align=center|21
|align=center|34
|align=center rowspan="2"|
|align=center rowspan="2"|
|align=center|Zone 6, 2nd Group
|-bgcolor=PowderBlue
|align=center bgcolor=tan|3
|align=center|40
|align=center|20
|align=center|9
|align=center|11
|align=center|65
|align=center|42
|align=center|49
|align=center|Zone 6, finals
|-bgcolor=PowderBlue
|align=center|1987
|align=center|27
|align=center|52
|align=center|11
|align=center|15
|align=center|26
|align=center|41
|align=center|67
|align=center|37
|align=center|
|align=center|
|align=center bgcolor=pink|Relegated
|-bgcolor=SteelBlue
|align=center rowspan="2"|1988
|align=center rowspan="4"|4th
|align=center bgcolor=gold|1
|align=center|22
|align=center|15
|align=center|4
|align=center|3
|align=center|55
|align=center|16
|align=center|34
|align=center|
|align=center|
|align=center|to Final group
|-bgcolor=SteelBlue
|align=center|4
|align=center|5
|align=center|1
|align=center|2
|align=center|2
|align=center|10
|align=center|8
|align=center|4
|align=center|
|align=center|
|align=center|
|-bgcolor=SteelBlue
|align=center rowspan="2"|1989
|align=center bgcolor=gold|1
|align=center|24
|align=center|18
|align=center|4
|align=center|2
|align=center|56
|align=center|15
|align=center|40
|align=center|
|align=center|
|align=center|to Final group
|-bgcolor=SteelBlue
|align=center bgcolor=gold|1
|align=center|5
|align=center|3
|align=center|1
|align=center|1
|align=center|13
|align=center|6
|align=center|7
|align=center|
|align=center|
|align=center bgcolor=lightgreen|Promoted (Finals)
|-bgcolor=SkyBlue
|align=center|1990
|align=center rowspan="2"|3rd (lower)
|align=center|11
|align=center|36
|align=center|14
|align=center|4
|align=center|18
|align=center|40
|align=center|41
|align=center|32
|align=center|
|align=center|
|align=center|
|-bgcolor=SkyBlue
|align=center|1991
|align=center|21
|align=center|50
|align=center|11
|align=center|20
|align=center|19
|align=center|48
|align=center|60
|align=center|42
|align=center|Ukr
|align=center| finals
|align=center|fall of USSR
|-
|}

Ukraine

CSKA Kyiv
{|class="wikitable"
|-bgcolor="#efefef"
! Season
! Div.
! Pos.
! Pl.
! W
! D
! L
! GS
! GA
! P
!Domestic Cup
!colspan=2|Europe
!Notes
|-
|align=center colspan=14|SKA Kyiv
|-bgcolor=LightCyan
|align=center|1992
|align=center|2nd "A"
|align=center|14
|align=center|26
|align=center|3
|align=center|3
|align=center|20
|align=center|14
|align=center|45
|align=center|9
|align=center|1/32 finals
|align=center|
|align=center|
|align=center bgcolor=pink|Relegated
|-
|align=center colspan=14|ZS Oriyana / CSK ZSU
|-bgcolor=PowderBlue
|align=center|1992–93
|align=center|3rd
|align=center|18
|align=center|34
|align=center|9
|align=center|7
|align=center|18
|align=center|27
|align=center|50
|align=center|25
|align=center|1/64 finals
|align=center|
|align=center|
|align=center bgcolor=pink|Relegated
|-bgcolor=SkyBlue
|align=center|1993–94
|align=center|3rd (lower)
|align=center|11
|align=center|34
|align=center|14
|align=center|4
|align=center|16
|align=center|45
|align=center|42
|align=center|32
|align=center|Did not qualify
|align=center|
|align=center|
|align=center|CSK ZSU Kyiv
|-
|align=center colspan=14|CSCA Kyiv
|-bgcolor=SkyBlue
|align=center|1994–95
|align=center|3rd (lower)
|align=center bgcolor=gold|1
|align=center|42
|align=center|32
|align=center|5
|align=center|5
|align=center|81
|align=center|28
|align=center|101
|align=center|1/32 finals
|align=center|
|align=center|
|align=center bgcolor=lightgreen|Promoted
|-bgcolor=PowderBlue
|align=center|1995–96
|align=center|3rd "A"
|align=center bgcolor=gold|1
|align=center|40
|align=center|27
|align=center|7
|align=center|9
|align=center|61
|align=center|27
|align=center|89
|align=center|1/16 finals
|align=center|
|align=center|
|align=center bgcolor=lightgreen|Promoted
|-
|align=center colspan=14|CSKA-2 Kyiv
|-bgcolor=LightCyan
|align=center|1996–97
|align=center rowspan="5"|2nd
|align=center|19
|align=center|46
|align=center|15
|align=center|9
|align=center|22
|align=center|37
|align=center|56
|align=center|54
|align=center|
|align=center|
|align=center|
|align=center|
|-bgcolor=LightCyan
|align=center|1997–98
|align=center|12
|align=center|42
|align=center|18
|align=center|5
|align=center|19
|align=center|56
|align=center|44
|align=center|59
|align=center|
|align=center|
|align=center|
|align=center|
|-bgcolor=LightCyan
|align=center|1998–99
|align=center|11
|align=center|38
|align=center|14
|align=center|10
|align=center|14
|align=center|45
|align=center|48
|align=center|52
|align=center|
|align=center|
|align=center|
|align=center|
|-bgcolor=LightCyan
|align=center|1999–00
|align=center|5
|align=center|34
|align=center|16
|align=center|6
|align=center|12
|align=center|38
|align=center|26
|align=center|54
|align=center|
|align=center|
|align=center|
|align=center|
|-bgcolor=LightCyan
|align=center|2000–01
|align=center|8
|align=center|34
|align=center|15
|align=center|1
|align=center|18
|align=center|36
|align=center|43
|align=center|46
|align=center|
|align=center|
|align=center|
|align=center|
|-
|align=center colspan=14|CSKA-2 / CSKA Kyiv
|-bgcolor=LightCyan
|align=center|2001–02
|align=center rowspan="7"|2nd
|align=center|14
|align=center|34
|align=center|10
|align=center|9
|align=center|15
|align=center|33
|align=center|38
|align=center|41
|align=center|1/32 finals
|align=center|
|align=center|
|align=center|Changed back to CSKA
|-bgcolor=LightCyan
|align=center|2002–03
|align=center|14
|align=center|34
|align=center|10
|align=center|11
|align=center|13
|align=center|33
|align=center|38
|align=center|41
|align=center|1/32 finals
|align=center|
|align=center|
|align=center|
|-bgcolor=LightCyan
|align=center|2003–04
|align=center|11
|align=center|34
|align=center|12
|align=center|6
|align=center|16
|align=center|29
|align=center|39
|align=center|42
|align=center|1/16 finals
|align=center|
|align=center|
|align=center|
|-bgcolor=LightCyan
|align=center|2004–05
|align=center|7
|align=center|34
|align=center|15
|align=center|6
|align=center|13
|align=center|28
|align=center|38
|align=center|51
|align=center|1/8 finals
|align=center|
|align=center|
|align=center|
|-bgcolor=LightCyan
|align=center|2005–06
|align=center|15
|align=center|34
|align=center|8
|align=center|8
|align=center|18
|align=center|25
|align=center|52
|align=center|32
|align=center|1/16 finals
|align=center|
|align=center|
|align=center|
|-bgcolor=LightCyan
|align=center|2006–07
|align=center|16
|align=center|36
|align=center|10
|align=center|8
|align=center|18
|align=center|24
|align=center|44
|align=center|38
|align=center|1/32 finals
|align=center|
|align=center|
|align=center|
|-bgcolor=LightCyan
|align=center|2007–08
|align=center|19
|align=center|38
|align=center|7
|align=center|6
|align=center|25
|align=center|36
|align=center|74
|align=center|27
|align=center|1/32 finals
|align=center|
|align=center|
|align=center bgcolor=pink|Relegated
|-bgcolor=PowderBlue
|align=center|2008–09
|align=center rowspan="2"|3rd "A"
|align=center|4
|align=center|32
|align=center|18
|align=center|3
|align=center|11
|align=center|38
|align=center|23
|align=center|57
|align=center|1/16 finals
|align=center|
|align=center|
|align=center|
|-bgcolor=PowderBlue
|align=center|2009–10
|align=center|-
|align=center|3
|align=center|1
|align=center|0
|align=center|2
|align=center|6
|align=center|6
|align=center|0
|align=center|1/16 finals
|align=center|
|align=center|
|align=center bgcolor=lightgrey|(−3) Withdrew, results removed
|}

CSKA-2 Kyiv / CSKA-3 Kyiv / KLO Bucha
{|class="wikitable"
|-bgcolor="#efefef"
! Season
! Div.
! Pos.
! Pl.
! W
! D
! L
! GS
! GA
! P
!Domestic Cup
!colspan=2|Europe
!Notes
|-bgcolor=SteelBlue
|align=center|1995–96
|align=center|4th
|align=center|4
|align=center|6
|align=center|0
|align=center|1
|align=center|5
|align=center|1
|align=center|11
|align=center|1
|align=center|
|align=center|
|align=center|
|align=center|as CSKA-2 Kyiv
|-
|align=center|1996-1999
|align=center colspan=13|Club idle
|-bgcolor=SteelBlue
|align=center|1999
|align=center|4th
|align=center|3
|align=center|10
|align=center|4
|align=center|1
|align=center|5
|align=center|10
|align=center|18
|align=center|13
|align=center|
|align=center|
|align=center|
|align=center|as CSKA-3 Kyiv
|-
|align=center|1999-2003
|align=center colspan=13|Club idle
|-bgcolor=SteelBlue
|align=center rowspan=3|2003
|align=center rowspan=3|4th
|align=center|2
|align=center|10
|align=center|5
|align=center|2
|align=center|3
|align=center|16
|align=center|12
|align=center|17
|align=center rowspan=3|
|align=center rowspan=3|
|align=center rowspan=3|
|align=center|as KLO-CSKA Bucha
|-bgcolor=SteelBlue
|align=center|5
|align=center|8
|align=center|2
|align=center|2
|align=center|4
|align=center|5
|align=center|10
|align=center|8
|align=center rowspan=2|as KLO Bucha
|-bgcolor=SteelBlue
|align=center|4
|align=center|3
|align=center|0
|align=center|0
|align=center|3
|align=center|1
|align=center|12
|align=center|0
|}
 In 1999–2000 CSKA-3 Kyiv was coached by Oleksandr Shcherbakov

CSKA Kyiv (predecessor of Arsenal Kyiv)
After being split from CSKA-Borysfen, the new CSKA was owned by company Kyiv–Donbas until in 2001 it was sold to the mayor of Kyiv, Oleksandr Omelchenko.
{|class="wikitable"
|-bgcolor="#efefef"
! Season
! Div.
! Pos.
! Pl.
! W
! D
! L
! GS
! GA
! P
!Domestic Cup
!colspan=2|Europe
!Notes
|-bgcolor=LightCyan
|align=center|Previous
|align=center colspan=13|Refer to FC Boryspil
|-
|align=center|1995–96
|align=center rowspan="6"|1st
|align=center|4
|align=center|34
|align=center|15
|align=center|11
|align=center|8
|align=center|47
|align=center|27
|align=center|56
|align=center|1/16 finals
|align=center|
|align=center|
|align=center|as CSKA-Borysfen Kyiv
|-
|align=center|1996–97
|align=center|11
|align=center|30
|align=center|9
|align=center|8
|align=center|13
|align=center|33
|align=center|35
|align=center|35
|align=center bgcolor=#A67D3D|1/2 finals
|align=center|
|align=center|
|align=center|
|-
|align=center|1997–98
|align=center|13
|align=center|30
|align=center|9
|align=center|6
|align=center|15
|align=center|30
|align=center|35
|align=center|33
|align=center bgcolor=silver|Runner-up
|align=center|
|align=center|
|align=center|
|-
|align=center|1998–99
|align=center|7
|align=center|30
|align=center|11
|align=center|10
|align=center|9
|align=center|37
|align=center|35
|align=center|43
|align=center|1/8 finals
|align=center|CWC
|align=center|1st round
|align=center|
|-
|align=center|1999–00
|align=center|10
|align=center|30
|align=center|9
|align=center|8
|align=center|13
|align=center|31
|align=center|36
|align=center|35
|align=center|1/4 finals
|align=center|
|align=center|
|align=center|
|-
|align=center|2000–01
|align=center|6
|align=center|26
|align=center|10
|align=center|10
|align=center|6
|align=center|30
|align=center|23
|align=center|40
|align=center bgcolor=silver|Runner-up
|align=center|
|align=center|
|align=center|
|-bgcolor=LightCyan
|align=center|After
|align=center colspan=13|Refer to FC Arsenal Kyiv
|}

European competitions
UEFA Cup Winners Cup

UEFA Europa League

Football kits and sponsors

Owners
 prior to 2001 – Central Sports Club of Armed Forces of Ukraine (state financed)
 2001–2009 – private owner
 since 2013 – CSKA of Ukraine (public organization)

Notes and references

See also
FC Arsenal Kyiv
FC Borysfen Boryspil

External links
 Public Organization CSKA Kyiv
 Unofficial site of the Army club
 Official website of CSK ZSU
 About the Sports Committee of Ministry of Defense

 
Football clubs in Kyiv
Armed Forces sports society (Ukraine)
Military association football clubs in Ukraine
1934 establishments in Ukraine
2013 establishments in Ukraine
2021 establishments in Ukraine
Association football clubs established in 1934
Association football clubs established in 2013
Association football clubs established in 2021